Marcelo Arévalo was the defending champion but chose not to defend his title.

Gerald Melzer won the title after defeating Facundo Mena 6–2, 3–6, 7–6(7–5) in the final.

Seeds

Draw

Finals

Top half

Bottom half

References

External links
Main draw
Qualifying draw

Open Bogotá - 1
2021 Singles